William Snyder (May 31, 1864 – April 26, 1934) was the head keeper at the Central Park Zoo where he instituted a system of animal swaps with other zoos.

Biography
He was born on May 31, 1864 in Pine Plains, New York to Christopher Snyder and Eliza Millis.

He had trained elephants at Ringling Bros. and Barnum & Bailey Circus. In 1903 he purchased Hattie, the elephant from Carl Hagenbeck and trained her for the Central Park Zoo.   Hattie was named after Snyder's daughter.

He died on April 25, 1934 in Pine Plains, New York.

He was buried in Rock City Cemetery in Rhinebeck, New York.

Legacy
The New York Times said: "As every one familiar with Zoo affairs knows that Snyder has had experiences beside which those of other keepers pale to insignificance, his opinion carries weight" and "his original observations on hitherto undiscovered and unsuspected traits among his charges have made him famous the world over."

External links

Images

References

1864 births
1934 deaths
Animal trainers
Central Park
Zookeepers